Frederick Community College (FCC) is a public community college in Frederick, Maryland.

Presidents

Campus
The FCC campus has moved several times over the years.  Originally the campus was within what is now Frederick High School.  It was moved to its current 97 acre location (7932  Pike, Frederick MD 21702) in 1970.

FCC has campus security on campus 24 hours a day. 

The Jack B. Kussmaul Theater – Arts Center is a cultural resource center that hosts quality performances, exhibitions, and educational programs for the college and the community.

Library 
The library was recently renovated to create a "learning commons".

Academics
FCC has over 85 different degree and continuing education programs.

Emergency Management
FCC offers Letters of Recognition, a Certificate, and an Associate of Applied Science degree in Emergency Management supported by FEMA's Emergency Management Institute Independent Study courses.

Athletics
The athletic department offers eight intercollegiate sports including men's baseball, basketball, golf and soccer and women's basketball, volleyball, softball and soccer.

References

External links

American Association of State Colleges and Universities
Educational institutions established in 1957
Universities and colleges in Frederick County, Maryland
Education in Frederick, Maryland
1957 establishments in Maryland
NJCAA athletics
Buildings and structures in Frederick County, Maryland